The American Americana musician Josh Ritter has released ten studio albums, five live albums, seven extended plays, and twenty singles. He debuted with a self-released, self-titled debut album in April 2000.

Ritter's most recent album is Fever Breaks, which was released in April 2019.

Albums

Studio albums 

Spectral lines 4/28/23

Live albums

Extended plays

Singles

References

External links 
 Official website
 Josh Ritter at AllMusic
 
 

Discographies of American artists